BBC-3 is a BBC television programme, devised and produced by Ned Sherrin and hosted by Robert Robinson, which aired for twenty-four hour-long editions during the winter of 1965–1966.

It was the third in a line of weekend satire-and-chat shows, successor to That Was The Week That Was and Not So Much a Programme, More a Way of Life, though David Frost did not participate in this series.

Regular performers included John Bird, Lynda Baron, David Battley, Roy Dotrice, Bill Oddie, and Leonard Rossiter. Guests included Millicent Martin and Alan Bennett. The musical director was Dave Lee. With its white sets, BBC-3 retained the look of its predecessor, Not So Much a Programme. Its name was a reference to the BBC's second channel, BBC2, which had started the previous year.

Swearing 

In the edition of 13 November 1965, during a discussion on theatre censorship in which Robert Robinson and Mary McCarthy also participated, Kenneth Tynan became the first person ever to say "fuck" on British television; he claimed, perhaps disingenuously, that the word no longer shocked anyone. The storm which resulted forced the BBC to make a public apology for Tynan's comments. No recording of the incident is known to exist.

References

External links 
BBC on BBC-3
Ned Sherrin obituary

BBC Television shows
Lost BBC episodes
1965 British television series debuts
1966 British television series endings
1960s British television series
BBC satirical television shows
1960s British satirical television series